The Pelska (also known as the Belka) is a river in southeastern Estonia, although its headwaters are on Russian territory. It is a right tributary of the Piusa.

The river has little organic matter in it, but it belongs to the "List of spawning places and habitation of salmon, brown trout, sea trout and grayling" in Estonia. The length of the river is 5.5 km, river basin is 85.2 km2. Võmmorski village is situated by the river.
The Pelska belongs to the "List of spawning places and habitation of salmon, brown trout, sea trout and grayling" in Estonia (RTL 2004, 87 1362). 

The name of the river is derived from the village of Pelska, through which the river flows on the Russian side of the border. On Estonian territory, the river flows through the village of Seto and is also called the Pelska Stream. The name Belka has come into use through Russian topographic maps. The river is a public watercourse in Estonia. The information about the size of its basin is based on accurate, contemporary information. Basin information is provided by the Land Improvement Offices put together in 2008 and 2009, or in the absence of it, information about the surface area of basins calculated from the 1990s drainage area map is used. Earlier used sources or other sources used for basin size: The list of 1986 - 85.2 km2; calculated from the basin map put together in the end of 1990s - 14.9 km2.

The Mustoja and Helbi streams flow into the Pelska; the river itself discharges into the Piusa. The European bullhead (Cottus cobio) is well known among the species of fish in the river.

References

Landforms of Võru County
Rivers of Estonia
Rivers of Pskov Oblast
International rivers of Europe
Estonia–Russia border
Border rivers